South Holston Lake is located near the cities of Abingdon, Virginia and Bristol, Virginia / Bristol, Tennessee, and is a  impoundment operated by the Tennessee Valley Authority (TVA). At this time there is a South Holston Reservoir Fishing License that will allow anglers from the two states to fish the entire lake with the purchase of this license.

Fishing and area information
South Holston offers good fishing for a variety of species. Black bass, bluegill, crappie, walleye, sunfish, and catfish are a few of the most sought after species. Predatory fish have diverse and abundant forage in the form of alewives, gizzard shad, threadfin shad and shiners. The lake's shoreline habitats offer anglers a good diversity of structure including rock bluffs, shale banks and flat clay points. Anglers who prefer trolling will also find a good selection of open water structure ranging from mud flats to river channel drop-offs to submerged islands.

Events
Every year on the 4th of July, the area has a fireworks display in which the fireworks can be seen everywhere over the lake. There are also many fishing and boat racing events in the summer.

References

External links
South Holston Lake

Holston River
Reservoirs in Virginia
Reservoirs in Tennessee
Protected areas of Sullivan County, Tennessee
Protected areas of Washington County, Virginia
Bodies of water of Sullivan County, Tennessee
Bodies of water of Washington County, Virginia